The Men's 800 metres event  at the 2004 IAAF World Indoor Championships was held on March 5–7.

Medalists

Results

Heat
First 2 of each heat (Q) and next 6 fastest (q) qualified for the semifinals.

Semifinals
First 2 of each semifinal (Q) qualified for the final.

Final

References
Results

800
800 metres at the World Athletics Indoor Championships